Haleem Brohi (5 August 1935 – 28 July 2010, Hyderabad) was a prominent Pakistani author and journalist, active in the Sindhi language. He is considered the second greatest satirist is Sindhi literature after Ali Mohammad Brohi.

Education and family
Brohi was the son of Aziz Brohi, a police officer. He graduate from the University of Sindh in 1956 and completed his LLB in 1960. He was married with four daughters.

Career
In his early career, he practiced law and also served at Sindh University in various capacities. He retired from Sindh University as chief accountant in 1980.

Literary career
Brohi started writing in 1967.  He published more than ten books. Amongst them were, in English: Solo Decayed, Nothing In Particular, Nothing In Earnest and in Sindh: Haleem Show, Orah ["Inferno"] (1975) and Hitler ji Kahani (1972), all in the early to mid-1970s.

Brohi was also instrumental in creating a Latin alphabet for the Sindhi language, and was a regular contributor to a popular Sindhi daily.

Death
Brohi died of a heart stroke at a local hospital. He was buried in the Cantonment graveyard in Hyderabad.

Awards
In 2009, Brohi was awarded the Shah Latif Award by Sindh Chief Minister, Syed Qaim Ali Shah.

References

1935 births
2010 deaths
Pakistani male journalists
People from Hyderabad District, Pakistan
Sindhi people
University of Sindh alumni
Writers from Sindh
Sindhi-language writers
Recipients of Latif Award